Timbe is a Papuan language spoken in Morobe Province, Papua New Guinea. Women and older men are monolingual.

References

External links
 Timbe Grammar Sketch

Languages of Morobe Province
Huon languages